Freebass were an English rock supergroup consisting of, originally, three bassists: Andy Rourke (formerly of The Smiths), Peter Hook (formerly of Joy Division & New Order) and Gary "Mani" Mounfield (of The Stone Roses and Primal Scream) and singer Gary Briggs (formerly of Haven).  Rourke subsequently left the line-up.

The band's sound has been described as "a heady mix of modern rock, dub, and Northern soul."

History
The idea to form a band centralised around three bass players came out on a drunken night, and was started by Hook and Mani as "a reaction because our groups New Order and Primals had been stalled". In a late 2005 interview with NME Peter Hook stated that all of the songs have three basses; "Mani does the low part, Andy Rourke in the middle and I do the high bit ... it works out quite well".  In 2006 the band recorded the theme song for the Channel 4 Radio program The Tube, an instrumental called "The Tower".

In a 2006 interview with Argentine newspaper Página/12, Hook expressed his satisfaction with the progress of the band, "We've already written 17 tracks and [the album]'s coming along very well. We hope to finish it soon."  He also explained why he was so determined to succeed.  "The reason we decided to do it was because everyone laughed in our face when we suggested the idea. So we thought, 'Fuck them!  We're gonna show them.'"

After Hook delayed the album for so long, in 2010 he launched a new website, worked out a distribution arrangement with American independent record label 24 Hour Service Station and released the debut Freebass recording Two Worlds Collide EP, as a digital download in March 2010 and on CD in August. A full album, titled It's a Beautiful Life, was again initially released as a digital download in April 2010, and as an expanded edition CD with three additional tracks and a bonus instrumental versions disc, on 20 September by Essential for Europe, Australia and South East Asia; and 7 December by 24 Hour Service Station for the rest of the world.

The band's official web-site confirmed in August 2010 that Rourke was no-longer part of the line-up, noting that "Andy Rourke was initially involved in the conception of the group and contributed to the EP and a few tracks on the LP. He is now living in NYC and will not be joining the band for live dates."

In September 2010, relations between Mounfield and Hook appeared to have soured.  On 6 September, Mounfield posted on his Twitter stream (@Maniscream) "Peter Hook's wallet" was "visible from space" because it was "stuffed with Ian Curtis' blood money", a reference to Hook forming Peter Hook & The Light which played Joy Division's music.  He further posted that "he ain't got time for me now he's getting fortunes for dragging his mates cadaver round the world getting himself paid".  Mounfield finally appeared to devolve himself from Freebass by stating he "Can't be doing with talentless nostalgia fuckwit whores".  Mounfield has since apologised for his remark, stating that his comments were "out of character" and that it was a "venomous, spiteful reaction to a lot of things that are going on in my life right now, and I chose to vent my frustrations and anger at one of my true friends in this filthy business, and ventured into territory which was none of my concern".  Hook accepted Mounfield's apology, saying "Mani is a great friend of mine and he always will be. I have the utmost respect for him as a person and musician. Have none of you ever fallen out with somebody you love?"

Discography

EPs
 Two Worlds Collide (EP) 2010 – 24 Hour Service Station
 You Don't Know This About Me – The Arthur Baker Remixes (digital EP) 2010 – 24 Hour Service Station
 Fritz von Runte vs Freebass Redesign (digital EP) 2010 – 24 Hour Service Station
 Two Worlds Collide – The Instrumental Mixes (digital EP) 2010 – 24 Hour Service Station

Singles
 "Live Tomorrow You Go Down" (digital single) 2010 – 24 Hour Service Station

Studio albums
 It's a Beautiful Life (LP) 2010 – 24 Hour Service Station / Essential (Europe, Australia & SE Asia)

References

External links
 Interview about Freebass on XFM
 Peter Hook talks Freebass
 Hacienda Records Partners With American Record Label 24 Hour Service Station
 CincyMusic Profile

British alternative rock groups
Musical groups established in 2005
British supergroups
Rock music supergroups
24 Hour Service Station artists
Musical groups disestablished in 2010
2005 establishments in the United Kingdom
2010 disestablishments in the United Kingdom